Robert Ash  may refer to:

Rob Ash (born 1951), American football coach
Bobby Ash (1924–2007), British actor
Bob Ash (born 1943), Canadian ice hockey player
Robert Ash (engineer), Robert "Bob" Ash, American engineer and academic; Professor of Mechanical & Aerospace Engineering

See also
Robert Ashe (disambiguation)